Birchgrove may refer to:

 Birchgrove, West Sussex, a location in England

Australia
 Birchgrove, New South Wales, a suburb in the municipality of Leichhardt
Birchgrove Park, a park and sports ground

Wales
 Birchgrove, Cardiff, a district in the city of Cardiff
 Birchgrove, Swansea, a community and large village in the city and county of Swansea